is a railway station on Kintetsu Railway's Kyoto Line in Fushimi, Kyoto, Japan. It is closely connected by a sheltered pedestrian bridge to Tambabashi Station on the Keihan Electric Railway Keihan Line.

Lines
Kintetsu Railway
Kyoto Line

Layout
The station has two side platforms and two tracks.

Platforms

Services
All trains, including all limited express trains, call at this station. The typical hourly weekday off-peak service from this station is:

Up trains (towards Kyoto and Kokusaikaikan)
10 trains to Kintetsu Kyoto, of which:
3 are limited expresses and run non-stop
3 are expresses and call at Takeda and Tōji
4 are local trains
3 trains to Kokusaikaikan on the Kyoto Subway Karasuma Line, of which:
1 is express and calls at Takeda, then all stations on the Karasuma Line
2 are local trains
(It may be faster to catch the first available train to Takeda and change there)

Down trains (towards Shin-Tanabe, Nara, Tenri and Kashihara)
2 limited expresses to Kashihara-jingū-mae, calling at Yamato-Saidaiji and Yamato-Yagi, of which:
1 couples with the limited express for Nara and decouples at Yamato-Saidaiji
2 limited expresses to Kintetsu Nara, calling at Yamato-Saidaiji, of which:
1 couples with the limited express for Kashihara-jingū-mae and decouples at Yamato-Saidaiji
2 expresses to Kashihara-jingū-mae, calling at Momoyama-Goryō-mae, Ōkubo, Shin-Tanabe, Shin-Hōsono, Takanohara, Yamato-Saidaiji, Kintetsu Kōriyama, Hirahata, Tawaramoto and Yamato-Yagi, then all stations
2 expresses to Kintetsu Nara, calling at Momoyama-Goryō-mae, Ōkubo, Shin-Tanabe, Shin-Hōsono, Takanohara, Yamato-Saidaiji and Shin-Ōmiya
6 local trains to Shin-Tanabe, of which:
3 continue to Yamato-Saidaiji of which 2 to Kashihara-jingū-mae

History

1928 -  begins operation as a station of Nara Electric Railway Co., Ltd.
1945 - Nara Electric Railway tracks are connected to Keihan's Tambabashi Station and Horiuchi station is discontinued
1963 - Nara Electric Railway merges into Kintetsu
1967 - Kintetsu platforms reopen for Kintetsu trains (except Keihan-through trains) as a part of integrated Tambabashi Station
1968 - Through trains to Keihan are discontinued, and station's Kintetsu section is renamed to Kintetsu Tambabashi Station
1998 - Promoted to Rapid Express stop
2002 - Promoted to Limited Express stop
2003 - Kyoto Line Rapid Express is discontinued

The route of the Kintetsu line north of this station was formerly a track of the Nara Line although the Nara Line did not have a station between Fushimi and Momoyama Stations. The former Nara Line south of this station to the merging point with the present line was totally removed and cannot be traced.

While the areas of the Keihan and Kintetsu stations are limited by Tanbabashi Street to the north and Shimo-Itabashi Street to the south, before the integration of the stations in 1945, the gate of Horiuchi Station was on Shimo-Itabashi Street and the gate of Tambabashi Station was on Tanbabashi Street. Therefore, transferring passengers were recommended to change trains at Momoyamagoryō-mae Station and Fushimi-Momoyama Station, both of which were facing the same Ōtesuji Street, rather than transferring at Horiuchi and Tambabashi. When the integrated station was separated in 1960s, the stations were rebuilt with a connection bridge that provides easy access between Tambabashi and Kintetsu-Tambabashi stations.

The physical connection of the Keihan and Nara Electric Railway lines and the integration of the stations were made to provide a redundancy for the railway network in consideration of a possible destruction of railway facilities by enemy attacks although the construction was completed in December 1945, after the end of World War II. The crossovers were removed after the end of through services in 1968, but the traces can be easily discovered.

Adjacent stations

References

External links

Station Facilities and Service (Kintetsu website)
Transition in Railroad Tracks around Tanbabashi Station 
Station Map

Railway stations in Kyoto
Railway stations in Japan opened in 1928